Mitja Okorn (born 26 January 1981) is a Slovenian film director and screenwriter. Most known as director of Letters to Santa, Planet Single and his Hollywood debut Life in a Year.

Early life 
He was born on 26 January 1981 in Kranj. He graduated at high school of economics and studied at School of Economics and Business in University of Ljubljana, then he quit the college in the third year. He never studied at Academy of Theatre, Radio, Film and Television (AGRFT) in Ljubljana, the main Slovenian film school institution, as he accused them of stagnating for decades. He is also very critical to Slovenian culture and film industry being total amateurs for ignoring him and not investing any money in his film projects.

Career

2005: First feature film 

In 2000 he started his career with two short documentaries Not sponsored 1 and Not sponsored 2; and awarded for short film Be Flexible at Motovun Film Festival in 2002. His career started to bloom in 2005 when he directed his first feature film Tu pa tam (Here and There) which premiered at his 24th birthday, a Slovenian film shown also at Sunderland Film Festival. This opened him doors to shoot numerous adds and music videos for Slovenian artists such as Dan D, Omar Naber, Alya, Elvis Jackson, Select, C.R.A.S.H, Kocka and Jah Waggie.

2007–2016: Huge success in Poland 
In 2007 he was one of ten nominated for IYSEY award for most promising Young Film Entrepreneur, which is awarded by British Council. After that he spent two weeks in Wales and London where he presented himself to expert jury, where he met Duncan Kenworthy who described him as a young director with full of energy and bright future. In fall he was invited by TVN, Polish commercial television to direct and co-write first season of Polish tv series 39 i pół (2008–09), which was a huge success in Poland with excellent ratings. After that he directed numerous commercials in Poland.

In 2011 he directed his first international feature film, romantic comedy Letters to Santa (Listy do M.) distributed by ITI Cinema, huge success in Poland with box office over $12 million. It was the most watched movie in Poland that year with over 850,000 viewers and total of over 2 millions. With 130 days, it is the second longest screening film in Polish cinema history, only after Titanic. Broadcasting rights were sold to various TV stations in Poland, the Czech Republic, Latvia and Slovenia.

In 2016 he directed his second Polish feature film, romantic comedy Planet Single (Planeta Singli) distributed by Kino Świat, was a commercial success back home and thanks to the roots of director, also in Slovenia. Number of tickets sold between first and second weekend of broadcasting in Poland increased for 156%, the most after 1989. Film was nominated for Golden Lion Award in the main category at 41st Film Festival in Gdynia.

2017–2020: Debut in Hollywood  
In 2017 he completed his Hollywood debut Life in a Year, an American romantic drama film, starring Jaden Smith, Cara Delevingne and Cuba Gooding Jr., which was produced by Overbrook Entertainment, co-owned by Will Smith and distributed by Columbia Pictures. It was released three years later due to some issues between production company and distributor. He became the first ever Slovenian director in Hollywood and one of few Slovenians in the heart of film industry.

Filmography

Feature films

Television

References

External links 

 

1981 births
Living people
Slovenian film directors
Film people from Kranj